is a North Korean national school (chōsen gakkō) in Mito, Ibaraki, Japan.

References

External links
 Ibaraki Korean Primary, Middle and High School 

Elementary schools in Japan
North Korean schools in Japan
High schools in Ibaraki Prefecture
Education in Ibaraki Prefecture